Cornelius White (born June 23, 1972 in Prince George's County, Maryland) is a former Arena Football League wide receiver/linebacker who played for the Albany Firebirds (1998–1999), the Carolina Cobras (2000–2001), the Chicago Rush (2002, 2006), the Buffalo/Columbus Destroyers (2003–2005), and the Philadelphia Soul (2006).

High school years
White attended Neshaminy High School in Langhorne, Pennsylvania. He participated in American football, basketball and track athletics. In football, he played quarterback and won an All-League honors and All-State honors.

College years
White played college football at Virginia Tech, finishing his career with 78 receptions for 1,114 yards (an average of 14.28 yards per reception) and seven touchdowns.

Flag years
White now plays recreational flag football in Raleigh, North Carolina, for the Blincos. He is also an integral part of the Turning Point Falcons, who play in the RDU Flag Football League.

References

External links
arenafootball.com player profile
AFL stats

1972 births
Living people
People from Prince George's County, Maryland
People from Bucks County, Pennsylvania
American football linebackers
American football wide receivers
Virginia Tech Hokies football players
Albany Firebirds players
Carolina Cobras players
Chicago Rush players
Buffalo Destroyers players
Columbus Destroyers players
Philadelphia Soul players
Players of American football from Pennsylvania